Patricia Conde may refer to:
 Patricia Conde (Spanish actress)
 Patricia Conde (Mexican actress)